American Rifleman is a United States-based monthly shooting and firearms interest publication, owned by the  National Rifle Association (NRA). It is the 33rd-most-widely-distributed consumer magazine and the NRA's primary magazine. The magazine has its headquarters in  Fairfax, Virginia.

History 
Arthur Corbin Gould, an avid shooter and member of the Massachusetts Rifle Association, published The Rifle in 1885 as an effort to focus discussion on the sport of rifle shooting.  The Rifle later changed its title to Shooting and Fishing in 1888, branching out into other outdoor sports. In 1894, while the magazine was titled Shooting and Fishing, Gould attended the National Rifle Association matches held at Sea Girt and was impressed with the level of competition, leading him to write several editorials urging the public to join. This call eventually led to the revitalization of the National Rifle Association and established a Board of Directors to help manage the nationwide organization.

Following Gould's death in 1903, Shooting and Fishing deteriorated. There had been no official connection between the NRA and the magazine, but Gould's prominence in the shooting world had helped establish and lend credibility to the organization as it tried to gain national footing. In 1906, James A. Drain, then Secretary of the NRA, purchased the magazine and renamed it Arms and the Man, becoming its editor and publisher. Two years later, as President of the NRA, Drain moved both the magazine and the NRA—officially two distinct entities—back to Washington D.C. in order to establish closer ties with the political aspects of rifle shooting. Though there was still no explicit tie between the magazine and the NRA, their relationship was extremely close.

In 1916, seven years after the end of his NRA presidency, James A. Drain decided to part with the magazine in order to fully devote himself to his law practice, though Arms and the Man had become the top magazine of its kind. At first, Drain tried unsuccessfully to sell the magazine to his former staff writer, Frank J. Kahrs, who had since moved on to Remington Arms, but Kahrs suggested instead that Drain offer the magazine to the NRA, since Arms and the Man had been an unofficial NRA journal. On July 1, 1916, James A. Drain sold Arms and the Man to the NRA for $1. Fred H. Phillips took over as editor, and Kendrick Scofield as associate editor, and, due to Drain's close ties to the organization, though there was a transition in leadership, there was no disruption of publication.

Following its move into NRA control, Arms and the Man, which had primarily focused on shooting competition results and discussion of rifles, began to expand into hunting stories, ballistics, handgunning, shotgunning and new shooting products In June 1923, the publication changed its name for the fourth and final time to the current title, The American Rifleman. In the aftermath of the name change, the scale of the magazine widened and four influential writers that would help shape the future of both The American Rifleman and shooting sports in general joined: Julian S. Hatcher, Charles Askins, Townsend Whelen and C.B. Lister. Also during this time, Hatcher began his column "The Dope Bag," a write-in question and answer column, which still continues today. By 1928, "The Dope Bag" had grown to 3 staff members, answering over 5000 letters that year. The prominence of rifle shooting, as well as the decision to include all NRA members with free copies of the magazine, helped boost the circulation to over 30,000, making the publication self-sustainable for the first time in its history.

Despite the harsh economic climate that caused the Great Depression in the 1930s, American Rifleman only continued to gain readers, eventually reaching a circulation of 56,000 and carrying its first full-color advertisement from the Packard Car Company.

During World War II, The American Rifleman Editor Bill Shadel received press credentials from CBS and shipped overseas to cover the European Theateras a  War Correspondent for CBS and NRA. His duties were taken over by his associate editors, and The American Rifleman carried articles and interviews by Shadel up until the end of the war. Also during World War II, the physical size of the magazine had to be cut in half due to wartime paper shortages. Due to the poor quality of paper that was used,  The American Rifleman began to rely on artwork more heavily than photography. Pulitzer Prize winning cartoonist James T. Berryman was brought in as art director. Following the war, C.B. Lister retained editorship of the magazine.

The American Rifleman continued to develop in scope following World War II. Lee Harvey Oswald killed US President John F. Kennedy with a rifle purchased from a Klein's Sporting Goods ad in the February 1963 issue of American Rifleman.  This prompted what the magazine called "a wave of anti-firearm feeling" and an "almost universal demand for tighter controls over the mail-order sales of guns."

In 1966, Ashley Halsey Jr. became editor for the magazine, bringing much more focus to the political realm, given the prominence of the bills proposed by senator Thomas Dodd restricting the sales of firearms across state lines. Halsey Jr. was a former writer at the Saturday Evening Post for 18 years, and became known for his prominent editorials and investigative articles. In 1971, The American Rifleman published a special centennial issue that was 168 pages long, by far the largest in the magazine's history. The centennial edition also included the first full-sized, full-color photographs of firearms ever printed in the magazine. Shortly afterward, in October 1973, hunting stories, reviews and tips were spun out into a separate publication, American Hunter, which was operating profitably within two years of its premiere. In 1993, the NRA launched another magazine titled America's First Freedom that specialized in political activism.

Content
The magazine is one of four NRA owned magazines included with an NRA membership, although discounted memberships with no magazine subscription are available.

Each issue contains reviews of different firearms, historical articles about firearms, technical information about reloading, notes from the President of the NRA and a column known as The armed citizen which lists specific events of people defending themselves with a firearm successfully.

References

Other sources

External links 
 American Rifleman's Official Website
 American Rifleman at the HathiTrust

1885 establishments in the United States
Monthly magazines published in the United States
Sports magazines published in the United States
Firearms magazines
House organs
Magazines established in 1885
Magazines published in Virginia
National Rifle Association